President's Security Division (PSD) is a unit of the Sri Lanka Police charged with the close protection of the President of Sri Lanka. It is headed by a gazetted officer of the rank of Deputy Inspector General of Police (DIG). Until 2008 the unit was controlled by army personnel assigned to President's protection, later these were absorbed into an independent unit named the President's Guard (dissolved in 2015). The unit consists of both uniformed and non-uniformed officers who provide close protection and guard Presidential residences.

See also
 President's Guard  
 Sri Lanka Police
 Prime Minister's Security Division

References

External links
President's Security now Comes Under New Army Unit      

Sri Lanka Police units
Protective security units